The Arab American Political Action Committee is a Political action committee that was established in 1998 by a group of Arab American professionals to 'organize and encourage the political activities of Arab Americans'.

 Formed: January 1998
 Independent Political Committee, State of Michigan ID # 508703-6
 Federal Election Commission ID # C00346239

Mission 
AAPAC was formed by a group of Arab American professionals to organize and encourage the political activities of Arab Americans. AAPAC is non-partisan and independent from any other existing organization or interest group. Their primary concern is the Arab American Community as a whole regardless of the personal interests of any individual or group of individuals. Their main objectives are to:

1. Prepare, advise and support Arab American candidates for political offices. Encourage and help Arab Americans to pursue public service careers in all branches of the government.
2. Maintain contact with political candidates, meet with them, discuss their platforms, introduce them to our community and its issues, and decide whom to endorse among them.
3. Lobby on behalf of the Arab American political causes which are of concern to the majority of the community as approved by the members of the organization.

Endorsement Process 

Candidates submit their endorsement request to AAPAC in writing. AAPAC's Endorsement Committee will then start the review process. This process includes any or all of the following: research of the candidate's voting record, review of his/her positions on the issues, review of his/her public statements, and/or a personal interview. The Endorsement Committee will then submit its recommendation to the general membership at the Endorsement Meeting. At that meeting, only candidates who obtain two-thirds of the votes will be endorsed.

Campaigns 
Once AAPAC endorses a candidate or a ballot proposal, its members will use all available resources to campaign on behalf of the candidate or proposal. The campaign may include: local TV appearances and commercials, newspapers ads, appearance with the candidate at community events, distribution of slate cards at the polls on election day, lawn signs, and most importantly direct bilingual mailing to Arab American registered voters in the affected area. For example, in November 1998 and May 1999, AAPAC mailed its newsletter and endorsements to over 9,300 Arab American voters in Dearborn and over 1,400 voters in Dearborn Heights.

External links
Official website

Organizations established in 1998
Arab-American organizations
Political advocacy groups in the United States